The 2006 Columbus Destroyers season was the 8th season for the franchise, and its 3rd in Columbus, Ohio. They finished the season with an 8–8 record.

Schedule

Coaching
Doug Kay started his first season as head coach of the Destroyers.

Columbus Destroyers
Columbus Destroyers seasons
2006 in sports in Ohio